George Nicol (28 December 1886 – 28 January 1967) was a British athlete.  He competed at the 1908 Summer Olympics in London at the 1912 Summer Olympics in Stockholm. He was born in Battersea.

Nicol won his preliminary heat in the 400 metres with a time of 50.8 seconds.  This qualified him to compete in the semifinals, where he placed third in his heat to be eliminated.

References

External links 
 

1886 births
1967 deaths
Athletes from London
People from Battersea
English male sprinters
British male sprinters
Olympic male sprinters
Olympic athletes of Great Britain
Olympic bronze medallists for Great Britain
Olympic bronze medalists in athletics (track and field)
Athletes (track and field) at the 1908 Summer Olympics
Athletes (track and field) at the 1912 Summer Olympics
Medalists at the 1912 Summer Olympics